Patriarch Macarius of Antioch may refer to:

 Macarius I of Antioch, Patriarch in 656–681
 Macarius II of Antioch, Patriarch in 1164–1166
 Macarius III Ibn al-Za'im, Patriarch in 1647–1672